Anthony Eugene Jackson (born January 17, 1958) is an American former professional basketball player. He played in two games for the NBA's Los Angeles Lakers in the beginning of the 1980–81 season after being selected by them in the 1980 NBA draft. He scored two total points in his career.

Jackson played for the Anchorage Northern Knights of the Continental Basketball Association during the 1980–81 season.

References

1958 births
Living people
American men's basketball players
Anchorage Northern Knights players
Basketball players from Lexington, Kentucky
Bryan Station High School alumni
Florida State Seminoles men's basketball players
Los Angeles Lakers draft picks
Los Angeles Lakers players
Point guards